The 1978 Open Tour of Britain was an edition of the Tour of Britain cycle race and was held from 7 August to 12 August 1978. The race started in Greenock and finished at the Crystal Palace circuit. The race was won by Johan van der Velde.

General classification

References

1978
Tour of Britain
Tour of Britain